IPO usually refers to an initial public offering.

IPO may also refer to:

 Immersion pulmonary oedema, a malady of swimmers and divers
 Intellectual Property Office (disambiguation), a government agency in many nations
 Intellectual Property Organisation of Pakistan
 Intellectual Property Owners Association
 International Philosophy Olympiad
 International Progress Organization, a Vienna-based think tank dealing with world affairs
 Interdecadal Pacific oscillation, an oceanographic/meteorological phenomenon
 Internationale Prüfungsordnung (IPO), an international dog sport, also known as Schutzhund
 Instituto Português de Oncologia, in Portugal
 IPO station, a metro station at the University of Porto, Portugal
 Israel Philharmonic Orchestra
 IPO model (Input, Processing, Output), a conceptual model of computer systems
 Interprocedural optimization, a computer program optimization method
 Independent Party of Oregon